Phyllodesmium iriomotense is a species of sea slug, an aeolid nudibranch, a marine gastropod mollusc in the family Facelinidae.

The specific name iriomotense refers to its type locality, the island Iriomote.

Distribution 
The type locality of this species is Iriomote, Ryukyu Islands, Japan. It has also been reported from Okinawa and Sulawesi, Indonesia.

Description 
The length of the slug is 20 mm. This species does not contain zooxanthellae.

Ecology 
Phyllodesmium iriomotense was found on a thread like alcyonarian which is probably its food.

References

Facelinidae
Gastropods described in 1991